In set theory, the Baire space is the set of all infinite sequences of natural numbers with a certain topology.  This space is commonly used in descriptive set theory, to the extent that its elements are often called "reals". It  is denoted NN, ωω, by the symbol  or also ωω, not to be confused with the countable ordinal obtained by ordinal exponentiation.

The Baire space is defined to be the Cartesian product of countably infinitely many copies of the set of natural numbers, and is given the product topology (where each copy of the set of natural numbers is given the discrete topology).  The Baire space is often represented using the tree of finite sequences of natural numbers.

The Baire space can be contrasted with Cantor space, the set of infinite sequences of binary digits.

Topology and trees 

The product topology used to define the Baire space can be described more concretely in terms of trees.  The basic open sets of the product topology are cylinder sets, here characterized as:

If any finite set of natural number coordinates I={i} is selected, and for each i a particular natural number value vi is selected, then the set of all infinite sequences of natural numbers that have value vi at position i is a basic open set.  Every open set is a countable union of a collection of these.

Using more formal notation, one can define the individual cylinders as

for a fixed integer location n and integer value v.  The cylinders are then the generators for the cylinder sets: the cylinder sets then consist of all intersections of a finite number of cylinders.  That is, given any finite set of natural number coordinates  and corresponding natural number values  for each , one considers the intersection of cylinders

This intersection is called a cylinder set, and the set of all such cylinder sets provides a basis for the product topology. Every open set is a countable union of such cylinder sets.

By moving to a different basis for the same topology, an alternate characterization of open sets can be obtained:
If a sequence of natural numbers {wi : i < n} is selected, then the set of all infinite sequences of natural numbers that have value wi at position i for all i < n  is a basic open set.  Every open set is a countable union of a collection of these.

Thus a basic open set in the Baire space is the set of all infinite sequences of natural numbers extending a common finite initial segment τ.  This leads to a representation of the Baire space as the set of all infinite paths passing through the full tree ω<ω of finite sequences of natural numbers ordered by extension.  Each finite initial segment is a node of the tree of finite sequences.  Each open set is determined by a (possibly infinite) union of nodes of that tree.  A point in Baire space is in an open set if and only if its path goes through one of the nodes in its determining union.

The representation of the Baire space as paths through a tree also gives a characterization of closed sets.  Every point in Baire space passes through a sequence of nodes of ω<ω.  Closed sets are complements of open sets.  Each closed set consists of all Baire sequences that do not pass through any node that defines its complementary open set.  For any closed subset C of Baire space there is a subtree T of ω<ω such that any point x is in C if and only if x is a path through T: the subtree T consists of all initial segments of elements of C.  Conversely, the set of paths through any subtree of ω<ω is a closed set.

Cartesian products also have an alternate topology, the box topology.  This topology is much finer than the product topology as it does not limit the indicator set  to be finite.  Conventionally, Baire space does not refer to this topology; it only refers to the product topology.

Properties 
The Baire space has the following properties:

 It is a perfect Polish space, which means it is a completely metrizable second countable space with no isolated points.  As such, it has the same cardinality as the real line and is a Baire space in the topological sense of the term.
 It is zero-dimensional and totally disconnected.
 It is not locally compact.
 It is universal for Polish spaces in the sense that it can be mapped continuously onto any non-empty Polish space.  Moreover, any Polish space has a dense Gδ subspace homeomorphic to a Gδ subspace of the Baire space.
 The Baire space is homeomorphic to the product of any finite or countable number of copies of itself.
 It is the automorphism group of a countably infinite saturated model  of some complete theory .

Relation to the real line 
The Baire space is homeomorphic to the set of irrational numbers when they are given  the subspace topology inherited from the real line.  A homeomorphism between Baire space and the irrationals can be constructed using continued fractions.  That is, given a sequence , we can assign a corresponding irrational number greater than 1

We see that the irrationals are the topological sum of four spaces homeomorphic to the Baire space and therefore also homeomorphic to the Baire space.

From the point of view of descriptive set theory, the fact that the real line is connected causes technical difficulties. For this reason, it is more common to study Baire space. Because every Polish space is the continuous image of Baire space, it is often possible to prove results about arbitrary Polish spaces by showing that these properties hold for Baire space and are preserved by continuous functions.

ωω is also of independent, but minor, interest in real analysis, where it is considered as a uniform space. The uniform structures of ωω and Ir (the irrationals) are different, however: ωω is complete in its usual metric while Ir is not (although these spaces are homeomorphic).

The shift operator
The shift operator on Baire space, when mapped to the unit interval of the reals, becomes the Gauss–Kuzmin–Wirsing operator . That is, given a sequence , the shift operator T returns .  Likewise, given the continued fraction , the Gauss map returns .  The corresponding operator for functions from Baire space to the complex plane is the Gauss–Kuzmin–Wirsing operator; it is the transfer operator of the Gauss map.  That is, one considers maps  from Baire space to the complex plane . This space of maps inherits a topology from the product topology on Baire space; for example, one may consider functions having uniform convergence. The shift map, acting on this space of functions, is then the GKW operator.

The Haar measure of the shift operator, that is, a function that is invariant under shifts, is given by the Minkowski measure .  That is, one has that , where T is the shift  and E any measurable subset of ωω.

See also

References 

 
 

Descriptive set theory
Topological spaces
Integer sequences